Yohmor or Yohmor al Beqaa  is a large village in the Beka'a Valley of Lebanon, situated in the Western Beqaa District in the south of the Beqaa Governorate. It lies south of Sohmor.

History
In 1838, Eli Smith noted  Yahmur  as a  village on the West side of the Beqaa Valley.

On 15 April 1996, during the seventeen day bombardment of south Lebanon by the Israeli army and air force, the hydroelectric power station on the Litani River, one kilometre north-east of Yohmor, was destroyed in an air raid.

A HRW report published in 2011 described Yohmor as having a population of 7,500, consisting of around 400 families. 60% of the workforce where involved in agriculture. 150 families made their living growing tobacco.
On 12 August 2006, two days before the end of the Israeli attack on Lebanon, Yohmor was blitzed by the IDF with 155mm artillery and air strikes. Thousands of cluster bombs landed on the village. Most of the inhabitants had fled the war zone and only twenty families remained. Unexploded bomblets littered the roads, gardens, on roofs and inside houses. Investigators found US made CBU-58 and BLU-63 bombs as well as missile fragments date stamped 1973. In the following two months, as villagers returned to their homes, one person was killed and five injured by these weapons.

References

Bibliography

External links
 Yohmor (Beqaa Ouest), Localiban 

Populated places in Western Beqaa District